The Chinese Elm cultivar Ulmus parvifolia 'Stone's Dwarf' was commercially released in the US in 1978.

Description
The clone is distinguished by its rough, but not corky, bark.

Pests and diseases
The species and its cultivars are highly resistant, but not immune, to Dutch elm disease, and unaffected by the Elm Leaf Beetle Xanthogaleruca luteola.

Cultivation
'Stone's Dwarf' is not known to be in cultivation beyond North America.

Accessions
None known.

References

Chinese elm cultivar
Ulmus articles missing images
Ulmus